Hylaeus alcyoneus, commonly known as the banksia bee, is a bee species endemic to Australia where it is commonly found in the coastal heaths of eastern and southern Western Australia. This bee is an important pollinator of Banksia species.

The banksia bee was originally described by German entomologist Wilhelm Ferdinand Erichson in 1842; its specific epithet is derived from the Ancient Greek halcyon "kingfisher" relating to its kingfisher blue colour.

The banksia bee has a metallic blue abdomen and yellow face markings. The sexual dimorphism of this species is notable amongst bees — the males of the species are significantly larger than the females; in most other types of bee, females are larger than males. Males of different sizes have been shown to display different feeding behaviour. Large males perch and defend Banksia inflorescences that are in high positions on the shrub where they feed; small males feed closer to the ground and patrol circuits including several inflorescences. Displacement of large males from the perches is almost always by an even larger male.

Western Australian banksias which the bee has been recorded visiting include Banksia ashbyi, B. coccinea, B. hookeriana, B. ilicifolia, B. menziesii, B. prionotes, B. sessilis, and B. speciosa. Other species include Allocasuarina campestris, Grevillea cagiana, G. eriostachya, Isopogon dubius, and Xanthorrhoea species.

The Banksia bee faces competition from the introduced European honey bee (Apis mellifera''). In sites where the species coexist, the Banksia bee has significantly fewer nests that it has on sites where there is no competition. A banksia bee nest consists of several cavities or cells within hollowed pieces of wood. A parent bee places provisions of pollen and nectar in each cell, along with a single egg.

References

Colletidae
Hymenoptera of Australia
Endemic fauna of Australia
Insects described in 1842
Taxa named by Wilhelm Ferdinand Erichson